Philippe Ambroise Durand (1799 – 11 February 1880) was a French abbé and chess writer.

Born in Fresné-la-Mère, Calvados, he was professor of rhetoric at Falaise and later taught philosophy at Lisieux before retiring in 1860.  Durand collaborated with Jean-Louis Preti to write three books on chess, including the two-volume Stratégie raisonnée des fins de partie (1871–73).  These were the first books devoted to the practical endgame, and included concepts such as conjugate squares and the opposition.  He is also said to have coined the chess term trébuchet. Durand died in Lisieux in 1880.

Publications

See also

 Chess endgame literature

References

Further reading
 Les Cahiers de l'Echiquier Français, Vol. 2, No. 2, 1932, p. 417–423
 La Stratégie, 1880, pp. 52, 65–67

1799 births
1880 deaths
People from Calvados (department)
French chess writers
Abbés
French male non-fiction writers
19th-century French Roman Catholic priests